AP English can stand for two distinct Advanced Placement Programs for U.S. high school students, provided by the College Board:

AP English Language and Composition
AP English Literature and Composition

See also
AP International English Language

Advanced Placement